Trnovska mafija is a novel by Slovenian author Dim Zupan. It was first published in 1992.

See also
List of Slovenian novels

References
Trnovska mafija, Zrss.si, accessed 19 July 2012

Slovenian novels
1992 novels